This list records the incumbents of the Roman Catholic Diocese of Hildesheim. Between 1235 and 1803 the bishops simultaneously officiating as rulers of princely rank (prince-bishop) in the Prince-Bishopric of Hildesheim, a state of imperial immediacy within the Holy Roman Empire. Hildesheim is the seat of the bishops and the cathedral chapter.

Titles of the incumbents of the Hildesheim See 
Between 1235 and 1803 the elected and papally confirmed bishops of the Hildesheim See were additionally imperially invested princely power as prince-bishops. In 1235 part of the Hildesheim diocesan territory, the episcopal and capitular temporalities (Stift) were disentangled from the Duchy of Brunswick and Lunenburg and became an own territory of imperial immediacy called Prince-Bishopric of Brunswick and Lunenburg, a vassal of the Holy Roman Empire. The prince-bishopric was an elective monarchy, with the monarch being the respective bishop usually elected by the Hildesheim Cathedral chapter and confirmed by the Holy See, or exceptionally only appointed by the Holy See. Papally confirmed bishops were then invested by the emperor with the princely regalia, thus the title prince-bishop. However, sometimes the respective incumbent of the see never gained a papal confirmation as bishop (lacking canonical qualification; e.g. Ferdinand of Bavaria and Frederick of Denmark), but was still invested the princely regalia. The respective incumbents of the see bore the following titles:

The respective incumbents of the see bore the following titles: 
 Bishop of Hildesheim from 815 to 1235
 Prince-bishop of Hildesheim from 1235 to 1803
 Bishop of Hildesheim since 1803

Bishops of Hildesheim till 1235

Prince-bishops of Hildesheim between 1235 and 1803

Bishops of Hildesheim since 1803

Auxiliary bishops
Johann Christiani von Schleppegrell, O.S.A. (7 Jun 1428 to 8 Oct 1468)
Johann Anguli Wilkelmann, O.F.M. (28 November 1436)
Johannes Tideln, O.P. (7 Feb 1477 to 28 Jul 1501)
Ludwig von Siegen (bishop), O.F.M. (20 May 1502 to 13 Feb 1508)
Balthasar Fannemann (Waneman) (26 Aug 1540 to 8 Oct 1561)
Nikolaus Arresdorf, O.F.M. Conv. (23 Nov 1592 to 28 Mar 1620)
Johannes Pelking (Pelcking), O.F.M. Conv. (16 Dec 1619 to 28 Dec 1642)
Adam Adami, O.S.B. (16 Dec 1652 to 19 Feb 1663)
Johann Heinrich von Anethan (6 Jul 1665 to 13 Nov 1676)
Friedrich von Tietzen-Schlütter (12 Dec 1677 to 4 Nov 1696)
Maximilian Heinrich von Weichs zu Rösberg (1 Oct 1703 to 20 Sep 1723)
Ernst Friedrich von Twickel (27 Sep 1724 to 17 Jan 1734)
Johann Wilhelm von Twickel (27 Jun 1735 to 10 Sep 1757)
Ludwig Hatteisen, O.S.B. (2 Oct 1758 to 3 Apr 1771) 
Johannes Bydolek (10 Sep 1949 to 18 Oct 1957)
Heinrich Pachowiak (27 May 1958 to 24 Aug 1992)
Adolf Kindermann (11 Jul 1966 to 23 Oct 1974) 
Heinrich Machens (24 Mar 1976 to 11 Feb 1994)
Hans-Georg Koitz 24 Aug 1992 to 4 Dec 2010) 
Nikolaus Schwerdtfeger (19 Jun 1995 -) 
Heinz-Günter Bongartz (4 Dec 2010 -)

References

Hildesheim
Lists of office-holders in Germany
 
History of Hildesheim